Leigh Howard (born 18 October 1989) is an Australian professional racing cyclist. He qualified for the Tokyo 2020 Olympics in both the Men's Madison and Men's Team Pursuit. Howard was part of the Men's team pursuit together with Kelland O'Brien, Sam Weisford and Alexander Porter. They secured a bronze medal after overlapping New Zealand who had crashed. Howard also competed in the Men's Madison where the team finished fifth with a time of 3:48.448 and therefore did not qualify for the final.

Career
Born in Geelong, Victoria, Australia, Howard now resides in Waurn Ponds, Victoria. He began cycling competitively at the age of 10 and first represented Australia in 2005 at the age of 16. Howard is an Australian Institute of Sport scholarship holder, and initially trained as an automobile electrician.

Howard won the bronze medal in the omnium event at the 2008 UCI Track Cycling World Championships. He went on to take several medals in round 2 and 4 of the 2008–09 UCI Track Cycling World Cup Classics. In 2009, he again won a medal in the omnium at the World Championships, this time taking gold, he also took the silver medal in both the madison and team pursuit. Howard also had success on the road in 2009, winning stages 1 and 3 of the Tour of Japan.

In his first professional race with team HTC Columbia, Howard won the fourth stage of the Tour of Oman. Impressively, Howard finished ahead of Daniele Bennati, Tom Boonen and Tyler Farrar on the stage. In November 2015  announced that Howard would join them for the 2016 season, with a role as part of the sprint train for Matteo Pelucchi.

Howard last rode for UCI Continental team .

Major results

Road

2006
 3rd Time trial, National Junior Championships
2007
 Tour of Tasmania
1st Stages 1, 4 & 7
2008
 1st  Overall Tour of the Murray River
1st Stages 5 & 13
 1st Coppa Colli Briantei Internazionale
 Tour of Gippsland
1st Stages 6 & 8
 Tour of Tasmania
1st Stages 1 & 8
 1st Stage 2 Australian Cycling Grand Prix
 10th Overall Tour de Berlin
1st Stage 2
2009
 1st  Overall Tour of Gippsland
1st Stages 2, 3, 6 & 9
 1st  Overall Okolo Slovenska
 1st Classic Astico – Brenta
 Tour of Japan
1st  Points classification
1st Stages 1, 3 & 7
 1st Stage 1 Thüringen Rundfahrt der U23
 4th Circuito del Porto
 8th Giro del Belvedere
2010
 1st  Kampioenschap van Vlaanderen
 1st Stage 4 Tour of Oman
 1st  Sprints classification, Bayern–Rundfahrt
2011
 1st Stage 5 Ster Elektrotoer
 3rd Trofeo Cala Millor
 4th Grand Prix de Denain
2012
 1st Stage 2 (TTT) Eneco Tour
 3rd Overall Tour of Britain
1st Stage 2
2013
 1st Trofeo Campos–Santanyí–Ses Salines
 1st Trofeo Platja de Muro
 8th Vuelta a La Rioja
2014
 5th Gran Premio Nobili Rubinetterie
 7th Overall Tour of Alberta
2015
 6th RideLondon–Surrey Classic
2016
 1st Clásica de Almería
 1st Stage 1 Tour des Fjords
 2nd Cadel Evans Great Ocean Road Race

Grand Tour general classification results timeline

Track

2007
 UIV Cup
1st Amsterdam
1st Dortmund
2008
 National Championships
1st  Team pursuit
1st  Scratch
 UIV Cup
1st Amsterdam
1st Munich
2009
 1st  Omnium, UCI World Championships
2010
 1st  Madison (with Cameron Meyer), UCI World Championships
2011
 1st  Madison (with Cameron Meyer), UCI World Championships
2018
 1st  Team pursuit, Commonwealth Games
 2nd Six Days of London (with Kelland O'Brien)
2021
 3rd  Team pursuit, Olympic Games

See also
Cycling in Geelong

References

External links

Leigh Howard – Biography at the Australian Institute of Sport website

1989 births
Living people
Australian male cyclists
UCI Track Cycling World Champions (men)
Cyclists from Victoria (Australia)
Australian Institute of Sport cyclists
Cyclists at the 2018 Commonwealth Games
Commonwealth Games medallists in cycling
Commonwealth Games gold medallists for Australia
Australian track cyclists
Olympic cyclists of Australia
Cyclists at the 2020 Summer Olympics
Medalists at the 2020 Summer Olympics
Olympic bronze medalists for Australia
Olympic medalists in cycling
20th-century Australian people
21st-century Australian people
Sportspeople from Geelong
Medallists at the 2018 Commonwealth Games